SMD or smd may refer to:

Organizations
 Science Mission Directorate, a body within NASA
 Sharjah Museums Department, former name of the Sharjah Museums Authority
 Soil Machine Dynamics, an underwater vehicles company founded by Alan Reece

Music
 Simian Mobile Disco, an English electronic music duo
 Slipmatt Dubs (born 1967), Breakbeat hardcore series
 Sacræ Musicæ Doctor (Doctor of Sacred Music)

Science and technology
 Standardized mean difference, a basis for effect size in statistics
 Sauter mean diameter, in fluid dynamics
 , audio release format developed in Brazil
 Service Mapping Description, a proposed standard for describing web services
 Stereotypic movement disorder, a motor disorder
 Storage Module Device, 1970s CDC disk drives
 Surface-mounted device, an electronic component used in surface-mount technology
 SMD LED module, a common component of an LED lamp

Other uses
 Sega Mega Drive, a fourth-generation video game console
 Single-member district, a type of electoral district
 SMD High School, Srinagar, Jammu and Kashmir, India

Codes
 IATA and FAA identifier for Smith Field (Indiana) airport, Fort Wayne, Indiana, US